131 (one hundred [and] thirty-one) is the natural number following 130 and preceding 132.

In mathematics
131 is a Sophie Germain prime, an irregular prime, the second 3-digit palindromic prime, and also a permutable prime with 113 and 311. It can be expressed as the sum of three consecutive primes, 131 = 41 + 43 + 47. 131 is an Eisenstein prime with no imaginary part and real part of the form . Because the next odd number, 133, is a semiprime, 131 is a Chen prime. 131 is an Ulam number.

131 is a full reptend prime in base 10 (and also in base 2). The decimal expansion of 1/131 repeats the digits 007633587786259541984732824427480916030534351145038167938931 297709923664122137404580152671755725190839694656488549618320 6106870229 indefinitely.

In the military
 Convair C-131 Samaritan was an American military transport produced from 1954 to 1956
 Strike Fighter Squadron (VFA-131) is a United States Navy F/A-18C Hornet fighter squadron stationed at Naval Air Station Oceana
 Tiger 131 is a German Tiger I heavy tank captured in Tunisia by the British 48th Royal Tank Regiment during World War II
  was a Mission Buenaventura-class fleet oiler during World War II
  was a is a United States Navy  ship during World War II
  was a United States Navy 
  was a United States Navy General G. O. Squier-class transport ship during World War II
  was a United States Navy  during World War II
  was a United States Navy  during World War II
  was a ship of the United States Navy during World War II
 ZIL-131 is a 3.5-ton 6x6 army truck

In transportation
 London Buses route 131 is a Transport for London contracted bus route in London
 The Fiat 131 Mirafiori small/medium family car produced from 1974 to 1984
 STS-131 is a NASA Contingency Logistic Flight (CLF) of the Space Shuttle Atlantis which launched in April 2010

In other fields
131 is also:
 The year AD 131 or 131 BC
 131 AH is a year in the Islamic calendar that corresponds to 748 – 749 CE.
 131 Vala is an inner main belt asteroid
 Iodine-131, or radioiodine, is a radioisotope of iodine for medical and pharmaceutical use
 ACP-131 is the controlling publication for listing of Q codes and Z codes, as published by NATO Allied countries
 Sonnet 131 by William Shakespeare
 131 is the medical emergency telephone number in Chile
 United States Citizenship and Immigration Services Form I-131 to apply for a travel document, reentry permit, refugee travel document or advance parole
 131 is the ID3v1 tag equivalent to Indie music

See also 
 List of highways numbered 131
 United Nations Security Council Resolution 131

References

Integers